Equitius, or Aequitius, was magister militum (or master of soldiers) in Illyricum in the Roman Empire.

Career
Born in Pannonia, he served together with the future Emperor Valentinian I as scutarius (or guardsman). Being one of Valentinian's principal supporters, the new Emperor made Equitius magister militum in Illyricum in 364. When Procopius rose up against Valentinian, Equitius remained loyal to the Emperor. Procopius sent envoys to the Illyrian troops to secure their support, but Equitius had them captured and killed. Valentinian appointed Equitius consul in 374. He was last seen in the region of Illyria in 384.

References

Sources 

4th-century Roman consuls
Comites rei militaris
Imperial Roman consuls
Magistri militum